Enigmatic is an adjective meaning "mysterious" or "puzzling". It may also refer to:

 Enigmatic, a 1970 album by Czesław Niemen
 Enigmatic: Calling, a 2005 album by Norwegian progressive metal band Pagan's Mind
 Enigmatic scale, musical scale used by Verdi and others
 "The Enigmatic", a song by Joe Satriani on the album Not of This Earth

See also
 Enigmatic leaf turtle, a species of Asian leaf turtle
 Enigmatic moray eel, a species found in the Pacific and Indian Oceans
 Glaresis, a genus of beetles sometimes called "enigmatic scarab beetles"
 Enigma (disambiguation)